The sleek unicornfish (Naso hexacanthus), also known as the blacktongue unicornfish or ʻopelu kala, is a tropical fish in the family Acanthuridae found in coral reefs in the Pacific and Indian Oceans. It is of value in commercial fisheries and as a gamefish, and is also seen in aquaria.

Description 
The species does not present a horn like other species in its family. Its colors range from a dark brown to yellow, on occasion changing to blue or silver. Adults measure 75 centimeters in length. The teeth are angled backwards; the tongue is black.

Distribution and habitat 
The sleek unicornfish is distributed in the Indo-Pacific, from the Hawaiian islands to Africa and India. It inhabits lagoons and seaward reef slopes. Due to the sleek unicornfish being seen worldwide their conservation status is labeled as least concern.

Ecology
The species consumes plankton and small crustaceans, as well as filamentous algae. It is the subject of moderate fisheries.

References

External links
 

hexacanthus
Fish of Hawaii
Fish described in 1855
Wikipedia Student Program